Sophia Dellaporta (fl. after 1850) was a Greek composer. She published a musical titled Recueil in Leipzig in 1877, including eight songs. The collection won a prize at the Third Greek Composers' Competition conducted in Athens at the 1875 Olympic Exhibition.

References

Year of birth uncertain
Year of death uncertain
19th-century classical composers
Women classical composers
Greek classical composers
Music educators
19th-century women composers